TLDP or tLDP may refer to:

 The Linux Documentation Project
 targeted Label Distribution Protocol